Raymond of Antioch ( 1195 – 1213 in Tartus) was the eldest son of Bohemond IV of Antioch and the Plaisance of Gibelet.

18-year-old Raymond, who was the heir to the throne of Antioch and Tripoli, was murdered by the Assassins in 1213 outside the door of the Cathedral of Our Lady of Tortosa. An involvement of the Hospitallers, who were hostile to the victim's father, remained speculation in contemporary lore.

In retaliation, Bohemond IV and a reinforcement of Templars assaulted Khawabi in 1214. The Assassins requested aid from the Ayyubid ruler of Aleppo, az-Zahir Ghazi, who in turn appealed to his rival and uncle al-Adil, the Ayyubid sultan of Egypt. However, after al-Adil's son, al-Mu'azzam of Damascus, launched several raids against Bohemond's district of Tripoli, destroying all of its villages, Bohemond IV was compelled to withdraw from Khawabi and issue an apology to az-Zahir.

References

Bibliography

House of Poitiers
12th-century births
1213 deaths
Victims of the Order of Assassins